Second is the second extended play (EP) by British singer and songwriter Raye. It was released on 11 August 2016 through Polydor Records, and "I, U, Us" was released as the lead single from the EP on 14 October 2016.

Singles
Raye premiered the first promotional single from the EP, "Distraction", on 4 April 2016, followed by "Ambition" (featuring Stormzy), which was released on 22 April 2016. On 14 October 2016, the first official single, "I, U, Us" was officially released as the lead single. The single would receive a music video directed by singer Charli XCX. A live performance music video for "Shhh" was premiered on 17 November 2016.

Track listing

References

2016 EPs
Raye (singer) albums
Contemporary R&B EPs
Polydor Records EPs